is a district located in Hyōgo Prefecture, Japan.

As of 2003, the district has an estimated population of 65,709 and a density of 1,491.69 persons per km2. The total area is 44.05 km2.

Towns and villages
Harima
Inami

Districts in Hyōgo Prefecture